Solle v Butcher [1950] 1 KB 671 is an English contract law case, concerning the right to have a contract declared voidable in equity. Denning LJ reaffirmed a class of "equitable mistakes" in his judgment, which enabled a claimant to avoid a contract. Denning LJ said,

This would have essentially recognised a wider application of a duty of disclosure in most cases, triggered by actual knowledge of one party that another party was mistaken about terms. The case was doubted by a subsequent Court of Appeal case, The Great Peace.

Facts
Mr Charles Butcher, the landlord, had leased a flat in Maywood House, Beckenham, to Mr Godfrey Solle, the tenant, at £250 a year, both parties believing that the Rent Acts did not apply to the property. Mr Solle later claimed that he should be repaid money over the regulated rent for the flat. Mr Butcher counterclaimed that their contract should be void because both were mistaken about rent regulation applying. The Increase of Rent and Mortgage Interest (Restrictions) Act 1920 sections 1 and 14 and Rent and Mortgage Interest (Restrictions) Act 1938 section 7 regulated rent rises, and gave tenants basic rights upon renewal, to prevent the housing market becoming unaffordable. Butcher was in fact in a business partner, doing real estate, with Solle. In 1947, Butcher had bought that flat, with four others, that were damaged by a land mine in the war. He spent money renovating them and leased them out. In 1939, the first flat had been leased out to a third party at the regulated rent of £140 a year. In fact, the Rent Acts did apply, so without going through statutory procedures for letting, the true rent should have been fixed at the first flat’s previous rent, £140. Solle and Butcher’s business relationship had deteriorated, and so when Solle realized the mistake about rent regulation, he claimed the overpaid rent back (i.e. restitution) from Butcher. Butcher counterclaimed to rescind the whole contract for common mistake.

Judgment
The Court of Appeal held by a majority (Jenkins LJ dissenting) that there should be no order for restitution of the overpaid rent, and the contract should be rescinded on terms (i.e. with conditions attached) which Solle be allowed to choose whether to have a lease at £250, or whether to leave the flat.

Bucknill LJ held that Butcher, the landlord, was entitled to rescind the contract, saying the following:

Denning LJ, concurring, said the contract was valid at law, but voidable in equity. The court would have the discretion to impose terms for the contract being set aside. He said the following:

Jenkins LJ, dissenting, said the contract could not be rescinded because it was a mistake of law.

Significance
The doctrine of equitable mistake was doubted by the Court of Appeal's ruling in The Great Peace in 2002, and Lord Phillips MR formally disapproved of the Solle v Butcher judgement. Lord Phillips declared that the trial judge, Toulson J., had "reached the bold conclusion that the view of the jurisdiction of the court expressed by Denning LJ in Solle v Butcher was ‘over-broad’, by which he meant wrong"; and he went on to uphold the trial judge's decision.

Solle v Butcher had troubled academic and practising lawyers for decades, and there was some relief when the Great Peace case was decided.

Nevertheless, it remains a point of contention whether mistake in equity does, and should, enable rescission for wider reasons than acknowledged in The Great Peace and its restrictive interpretation.

See also

English contract law
Rent rights in England and Wales

References

English contract case law
1950 in case law
1950 in British law
Court of Appeal (England and Wales) cases